Henrykowo  (German: Heinrikau) is a village in the administrative district of Gmina Orneta, within Lidzbark County, Warmian-Masurian Voivodeship, in northern Poland.

References

Henrykowo